Make a Wish is an American children's television series which ran on ABC from 1971 to 1976. Produced by ABC News, it was hosted by musician Tom Chapin and created and produced by Lester Cooper. It replaced Discovery, a similar series for children also produced by ABC News since 1962.

Each episode of the series, broadcast on Sunday mornings, focused on a particular theme. One episode, for instance, was about snakes, and another was about motorcycles. Chapin would introduce the topic in much the same manner: "I think a snake is what I'll be. Imagine all the possibilities." After that there would be a sort of free association presentation on the theme featuring stock footage, animation and Chapin's music and voiceover commentary. The quick-cutting, free-association, stream-of-consciousness style of the show caused Chapin, years later during a talk show appearance, to jokingly describe Make a Wish as "a show for six-year old speed freaks".

The series won a Peabody Award for Best Children's Series in 1971.

Some songs performed on the show were written by Tom's brother, Harry Chapin. General composer of the show was Bernard Green, who also wrote the music to the title song "Make a Wish," with lyrics by Cooper, sung by Chapin.

In 1976, Make a Wish was replaced with Animals, Animals, Animals which featured much the same frantic visual-overload style, coupled with folk-style songs.

References

External links

Peabody Award-winning television programs
1970s American children's television series
American children's education television series
American Broadcasting Company original programming
ABC News
1971 American television series debuts
1976 American television series endings